Hymenogaster is a genus of fungi in the family Hymenogastraceae (Agaricales). The genus has a widespread distribution, especially in temperate regions, and contains about 100 species. The taxonomy of the European species was revised in 2011, and twelve species were recognized, for which an identification key was presented.

Species
The following is an incomplete list of species.

These European species were accepted by Stielow et al. in 2011:

References

Hymenogastraceae